The Cornish Foreshore Case was an arbitration case held between 1854 and 1858 to resolve a formal dispute between the British Crown and the Duchy of Cornwall over the rights to minerals and mines under the foreshore of Cornwall in the southwest of Britain, most of which was owned by the duchy. The arbitration led to the Cornwall Submarine Mines Act 1858, which confirmed those rights for the duchy between the high and low water marks but not beyond. Sir John Patteson served as arbitrator, while the Rt. Hon. Thomas Pemberton Leigh, Baron Kingsdown (during the course of the debate elevated to the peerage) represented the duchy.

The issue
The problem which gave rise to the dispute was explained by the Solicitor-General during parliamentary debates on the Cornwall Submarine Mines Bill, on 19 July 1858:

Cornwall Submarine Mines Act

The Cornwall Foreshore Dispute culminated in the Cornwall Submarine Mines Act 1858, described as, "An Act to declare and define the respective Rights of Her Majesty and of His Royal Highness the Prince of Wales and Duke of Cornwall to the Mines and Minerals in or under Land lying below High-water Mark, within and adjacent to the County of Cornwall, and for other Purposes". The act, as originally passed, determined that:

See also

Timeline of Cornish history

References

Duchy of Cornwall
History of Cornwall
Cornish nationalism
Politics of Cornwall
1858 in England
1858 in British law
Arbitration cases
1858 in case law
English land case law
19th century in Cornwall